Honiara is the capital and largest city of Solomon Islands, situated on the northwestern coast of Guadalcanal. , it had a population of 92,344 people. The city is served by Honiara International Airport and the seaport of Point Cruz, and lies along the Kukum Highway.

The airport area to the east of Honiara was the site of a battle between the United States and the Japanese during the Guadalcanal Campaign in World War II, the Battle of Henderson Field of 1942, from which America emerged victorious. After Honiara became the new administrative centre of the British Solomon Islands Protectorate in 1952 with the addition of many administrative buildings, the town began to develop and grow in population. Since the late 1990s, Honiara has suffered a turbulent history of ethnic violence and political unrest and is scarred by rioting. A coup attempt in June 2000 resulted in violent rebellions and fighting between the ethnic Malaitans of the Malaita Eagle Force (MEF) and the Guadalcanal natives of the Isatabu Freedom Movement (IFM).

Although a peace agreement was made in October 2000, violence ensued in the city streets in March 2002 when two diplomats from New Zealand and several others were murdered. In July 2003, conditions had become so bad in Honiara that the Regional Assistance Mission to Solomon Islands (RAMSI), consisting of multiple Pacific nations under Australian leadership, was invited into the country by the Solomons Government to restore order. In 2006, riots broke out following the election of Snyder Rini as Prime Minister, destroying a part of Chinatown and making more than 1,000 Chinese residents homeless. The riots devastated the town and tourism in the city and the islands was severely affected.

Honiara contains the majority of the major government buildings and institutions of Solomon Islands. The National Parliament of Solomon Islands, Honiara Solomon Islands College of Higher Education, International School in Honiara and University of the South Pacific Solomon Islands are located in Honiara as is the national museum and Honiara Market. Politically Honiara is divided into three parliamentary constituencies, electing three of the 50 members of the National Parliament. These constituencies, East Honiara, Central Honiara and West Honiara, are three of only six constituencies in the country to have an electorate of over 10,000 people.

Honiara is predominantly Christian and is served by the headquarters of the Church of the Province of Melanesia (Anglican), the Roman Catholic Archdiocese of Honiara, the South Seas Evangelical Church, the United Church, the Seventh-day Adventist Church and other Christian churches.

Population 
As of the 2021 census, Honiara's population is 92,344. This makes Honiara the most populous city in the Solomon Islands. It is also the fastest-growing population center in the Solomon Islands.  The population skews quite young; approximately 50% of Honiara's residents are younger than 30.  The Ministry of Lands and Survey reported in 2006 that there were 17,000 squatters.

History
The name Honiara derives from nagho ni ara which roughly translates as "place of the east wind" or "facing the southeast wind" in one of the Guadalcanal languages. The town has not been extensively documented and little detailed material exists on it.

World War II

During the battle, the US Marine and Army forces, under the overall command of Major General Alexander Vandegrift, repulsed an attack by the Japanese 17th Army, under the command of Japanese Lieutenant General Harukichi Hyakutake. The US forces were defending the Lunga River perimeter, which guarded Henderson Field on Guadalcanal, that had been captured from the Japanese by the Allies in landings on Guadalcanal on 7 August 1942. Hyakutake's force was sent to Guadalcanal in response to the Allied landings with the mission of recapturing the airfield and driving the Allied forces off of the island. The Japanese landed with 3,500 troops but the force soon grew to over 20,000 personnel, roughly equal to America's 23,000; each side had about 13,000 troops. 

The Japanese held this hilltop in the second half of 1942 and showered artillery fire on American troops at the Henderson airfield below the hill. Eventually, the hill was captured but the Japanese held on to the Gifu, Sea Horse, and Galloping Horse ridges for about a month. Most of the Japanese died of starvation, banzai assaults or direct killing.

Hyakutake's soldiers conducted several assaults over three days at various locations around the Lunga perimeter. Along the Matanikau River, the principal river flowing through what is now central Honiara, tanks attacked in pairs across the sandbar at the mouth of the river behind a barrage of artillery. Artillery, including  anti-tank guns, quickly destroyed all nine tanks. At the same time, four battalions of Marine artillery, totalling 40 howitzers, fired over 6,000 rounds into the area between Point Cruz and the Matanikau, causing heavy casualties in Nomasu Nakaguma's infantry battalions as they tried to approach the Marine lines. Both sides incurred heavy losses during the events of the overall battle, especially the Japanese attackers. After an attempt to deliver further reinforcements failed during the Naval Battle of Guadalcanal in November 1942, Japan conceded defeat in the struggle for the island and evacuated many of its remaining forces by the first week of February 1943. The Quonset hut built by the Americans can still be seen in the back lanes of the town and several memorials give testament to the war.

Modern development
Honiara officially became the capital of the British Protectorate of Solomon Islands in 1952. The infrastructure had been well developed by the US during the war which dictated the decision of the British Government to shift the capital to Honiara. Government buildings opened in Honiara from early January in 1952. Sir Robert Stanley was based at Honiara during his time as High Commissioner for the Western Pacific, which included the British Solomon Islands, the Condominium of New Hebrides (now Vanuatu) and the Gilbert and Ellice Islands colony (now Kiribati and Tuvalu). Dr. Macu Salato arrived in Honiara in early August 1954 and was based in the town, conducting surveys all across the islands and investigating leprosy. He departed and returned to Fiji in late March 1955. 

The town grew after Honiara became the capital city, receiving two-thirds of the allocations granted for the country's economic development in the 1960s and 1970s, resulting in substantial infrastructure development. Population growth was very slow and only about 5% of Solomon Islanders were living in the city. However, the Bellonese population significantly increased; they established permanent and semi-permanent houses in the Honiara vicinity, typically along the banks of the White River.  The town was affected by creolisation. In the 1960s, Pijin became its principal language, and the mother tongue of a generation of young urban adults and children. Through Honiara the language spread and has since become the main language spoken in the islands.

Rhys Richards, a New Zealand historian and former New Zealand High Commissioner of Solomon Islands, spent many years in Honiara. In 1979 Honiara was still a small town in terms of population, especially for a capital city, with 18,346 people, of which 10,870 were men, and 7,476 were women. In July 1978, Honiara became the new capital of the independent Solomon Islands.

Conflict
An International Express Mail Agreement and regulations were signed between the United States and Solomon Islands governments in Honiara and Washington, D.C. on 19 April and 27 June 1991, coming into effect on 1 August 1991. On 6 November 1998, a peace agreement was signed in Honiara between the United States and Solomon Islands governments. However, since the late 1990s, Honiara has been the centre of ethnic violence and political unrest in the country. The area around Honiara was the battle ground of rival factions during the unrest as a result of the dominance of Malaitans, who were outsiders, and the local Guadalcanal islanders.
A coup attempt occurred in June 2000 which resulted in violent rebellions and fighting between the Malaita Eagle Force (MEF) and the Guadalcanal natives of the Isatabu Freedom Movement (IFM). Violence was prevalent in the streets of Honiara, and although a peace agreement was made in October 2000, violence ensued in March 2002 when two diplomats from New Zealand and several others were murdered. Conditions became so bad in Honiara that in July 2003 Australian military and police units moved into the country to suppress the conflict, increase security, rebuild the damaged city and safeguard its shattered economic, political and legal institutions.

In 2006, riots broke out following the election of Snyder Rini as Prime Minister, destroying part of Chinatown and displacing more than 1,000 Chinese residents; the large Pacific Casino Hotel was also totally gutted. The commercial heart of Honiara was virtually reduced to rubble and ashes. Three National Parliament members, Charles Dausabea, Nelson Ne'e, and Patrick Vahoe, were arrested during or as a result of the riots. The Regional Assistance Mission to Solomon Islands (RAMSI), the 16-country Pacific Islands Forum initiative set up in 2003 with assistance from Australia, intervened, sending in additional police and army officers to bring the situation under control. A vote of no confidence was passed against the Prime Minister. Following his resignation, a five-party Grand Coalition for Change Government was formed in May 2006, with Manasseh Sogavare as Prime Minister, quelling the riots and running the government. The army part of RAMSI was removed and rebuilding took shape.

In 2021, Honiara saw mass unrest; the Solomon Islands Parliament Building was attacked, and Chinatown was looted and burned.

Geography and climate

Honiara is located on the northwestern coast of the island of Guadalcanal and includes a seaport at Point Cruz. The Matanikau River flows through the town, past Chinatown, badly affected by the 2006 riot. To the west of the town center are the suburbs of White River and Tanaghai.

Honiara is wetter between November and April. Honiara is subject to monsoons.

Politics

Honiara is divided into three parliamentary constituencies, electing three of the 50 Members of the National Parliament. These constituencies (East Honiara, Central Honiara and West Honiara) are three of only six constituencies in the country to have an electorate of over 10,000. East Honiara, with an electorate of 30,049 in 2006, is the only constituency in the country with more than 20,000 voters. Following the 2019 general election, the city's representatives are:

Administrative divisions
The National Capital Region of Honiara is sub-divided into the following wards, listed from West to East:

Economy 

Honiara developed economically at a much faster rate than other parts of Solomon Islands; during the 1960s and 1970s, some two-thirds of the investment into economic development in the country went into developing the infrastructure of Honiara, despite the fact that at the time only some five percent of Solomon Islanders lived there.  Like Tulagi, the town did not grow substantially as a result of industrialisation. As Trevor Sofield says, "The shops and businesses in these centers served the needs of the government officials and expatriate businessmen, planters, and traders. Honiara, like many other ex-colonial cities, still reflects the political, economic, and cultural structure of its former metropolitan mentor much more than it does the national traits of Solomon Islands society."

Honiara is Solomon Islands' springboard for tourism activities. The country's tourist office, Solomon Islands Visitors Bureau, is on Honiara's main thoroughfare, Mendana Avenue. Situated between the Yacht Club and the Solomon Kitano Mendana Hotel, its officers provide tourist information and can radio ahead to announce visitors' arrivals to guest houses in the remoter areas. Honiara banks include BSP Bank, the ANZ Bank, BRED Bank and POB Bank. Anchorage facilities are available in Honiara Port for both national and international ships.

The violence which had plagued Honiara and the islands since the late 1990s had a devastating impact on the economy due to the fact that many tourist organisations around the world warned tourists wishing to visit the islands to stay away, especially in 2002 and 2003 at the peak of the troubles. In 1998, the country earned around $13 million from tourism and just $629,000 in 1999, equating to an average spend per visit of only US$254 (about US$35/day). In 1999, tourism in the city and nation accounted for just 4.38% of the total GDP.

Landmarks
As the capital of Solomon Islands, Honiara contains the majority of the major government buildings and institutions, including Honiara Lauru Land Conference, Honiara Solomon Islands College of Higher Education, International School in Honiara, University of the South Pacific Solomon Islands, Honiara Solomon Islands Ports Authority. These centres are involved in marine research in Solomon Islands. The Dodo Creek Research Station of the Ministry of Agriculture and Lands is based in Honiara.  Honiara Central Market is the centre of trading activity in the islands and contains many market stalls selling a wide range of goods. East of the mouth of the Mataniko River is the beach where, in the shallow waters of the sea, wrecks of a Japanese ship destroyed on 23 October 1942 by American artillery and small arms can be seen. At the back of the beach there is a settlement called the Lord Howe Settlement, consisting of a large community of Polynesians from Ongtong Java in the Western Provinces. Chinatown, with its high porches, is said to look like an "Asian Wild West".

Honiara Children's Park is a property of the Honiara Beautification Committee. The park, the only children's recreation area in Honiara, is located along the eastern coast of Honiara City as all other areas in the region are private property. This erosion needs to be checked by building a retaining wall.

War memorial and peace park

The Guadalcanal American Memorial is an attraction. It was built at the initiative of Robert F Reynolds, Chief of Valors Tours Ltd. To mark the 50th anniversary of the Red Beach landings, the U.S. War Memorial was dedicated on 7 August 1992. An account of this is inscribed on red marble tablets inside the monument compound.
The Solomons Peace Memorial Park, built by the Japanese war veterans in memory of all those who were killed in World War II, is about  down the coastal road. There are several other relics from World War II in and around Honiara, described by "Lonely Planet" as "spooky". Also seen is the memorial erected in honour of Sergeant Major Jacob Vouza, a highly decorated war hero who escaped after the Japanese tortured him and lived to tell his story.

National Parliament and Government House

The Solomon Islands Parliament Building, located on the hill above Hibiscus Avenue, built with American aid, is a concrete structure of conical-shape, which was inaugurated in 1993. The dome has tapestry, frescoes, and traditional artwork. The parliament building was built at a cost of US$5 million in honour of the 450 U.S. soldiers and 1,200 Marines who died during the Guadalcanal operations during the war. Ironically the building was originally built by a Japanese firm.

Museums
The National Museum, located opposite the Mendana Hotel, has exhibits of traditional handicrafts and historical artefacts, particularly exhibits on archaeology, currencies, arms, languages, personal ornaments, traditional music and dance, agricultural implements, life and natural environs of the country, fishing tools and tackles, and many publications and handicrafts. The Cultural Centre of the museum has a display of eight traditional houses, built in 1981, from the nine provinces of Solomon Islands. The museum hosted the first Melanesian Arts and Crafts festival in 1998, and organises dances on the festival stage opposite the museum. There is also a  Japanese howitzer on display between the museum and the police station, which is called "Pistol Pete". It was used for bombarding Henderson Field during the Guadalcanal fighting. On the opposite side of the police station is the Central Bank, which has a display of traditional currency. It also has Rennellese wood carvings and paintings. The Cultural Centre behind the museum has exhibits of traditional architectural styles. The National Art Gallery arranges painting exhibitions at the Old Government House, the former residence of the Governor General. A collection of historical importance can be seen at the National Archives which is open to the public.

The Botanical Gardens of the National Art Gallery is popular for afternoon strolls, and is noted for its orchids and shrubs. It houses a herbarium, a lily studded waterbody, walkways, and the Watapamu village, representing a typical village of the islands, which is named after the water pump located nearby. An Anthropology Museum is located in Honiara, which has exhibits of recent origin.

Schools
Prominent educational institutions in Honiara include Solomon Islands National University (SINU); The Woodford International School; and the University of the South Pacific (USP) Solomon Islands Campus.

The Woodford International School, also called the International School, was initiated in the mid-1950s with about a dozen students. It was expanded under Solomon Islands' National Development Plan in the 1970s with the aim to attract investment and expertise into the country. In 1979, following independence in 1978 from the British rule, with British aid, new school buildings were built. The school was known as Honiara International School in September 1989 and took the name of Woodford International School in the 1990s. It is now a fully recognised independent education authority, and the government of Solomon Islands is only involved in providing a grant to the school. Since 2007, the management has started a programme of enhancing the building and other infrastructure facilities of the school to seek recognition as an "International Baccalaureate World School".

The University of the South Pacific (USP) Solomon Islands Campus at Honiara provides education to students of the South Pacific.

Libraries and books
The Public Library is on Belan Avenue, between Chinatown and the market place, while the National Library is just behind the Public Library. Books authored by Solomon Islanders are available at the University of the South Pacific Centre, which is behind the National Gymnasium to the east of Chinatown. Books are also on sale at Riley's Pocket Bookstore in the lobby of the Honiara Hotel with works by authors including John Saunana and Julian Maka'a. Another bookstore opened in 2010 called the "Save Senta"; it is located at Point Cruz in Honiara.
Australian newspapers are available at the news stalls in the Anthony Saru building. Solomon Islands Development Trust in New Chinatown publishes a quarterly journal titled Link on issues of local concern and environmental issues. The daily newspaper is Solomon Star while Solomon Times and Solomon Voice are weekly publications.

Hospitals
The National Referral Hospital of Honiara (NRH), also known as the Central Referral Hospital, is the main hospital and the largest in Solomon Islands. It is located opposite the Honiara Hotel. As of July 2012 the hospital, which suffers from overcrowding,  had 300 to 400 beds with 50 doctors. In 2008, its accident and emergency department served 55,234 patients and its general surgery department operated on 1,971 patients.

Another hospital is the Central Hospital. Now called the Nambanaen, it was originally a wartime hospital built by the Americans who called it the "Ninth Station". It was substantially enlarged with assistance from the Government of Taiwan in 1993.

Churches

One of the largest churches in Honiara is the Cathedral Church of St Barnabas, Honiara, consecrated in 1969, which could seat nine hundred people. Holy Cross Cathedral, Honiara, consecrated in 1957, is a large Roman Catholic church on hill in the east of the centre. Originally All Saints Church, which is known for its choir and its colourful wall painting, was the cathedral of Honiara. The present building dates from 1971. At the entrance a large drum can be seen which is used to call the parish members for prayer.

Hotels and restaurants

Honiara has  hotels and restaurants. Honiara Hotel is a traditional hotel and features a dance show on Friday nights. The Pacific Casino is a $20 million Chinese hotel and casino in Honiara which replaced the King Solomon Hotel, which was gutted during the 2006 riots. Restaurants of note include the Capitana Restaurant of the Mendana Hotel (serving Japanese cuisine), the Le Rendezvous Restaurant of the King Solomon Hotel (serving Oriental cuisine), Club Havanah in the Honiara Hotel, Raintree Cafe, Ning's Coffee Shop, and Hong Kong Palace, located in a "blood-red pagoda on Hibuscus Avenue".

Culture

In 1974, Polynesian Dances of Bellona (Mungiki), which included suahongi form, forbidden to be performed by the Seventh Day Adventist missionaries, was revived and recorded in Honiara. Suahongi is performed at the conclusion of the ritual of sharing in a ceremony called manga'e, (performed by men) of the surplus harvest of fishing and garden crops. The dance is performed to rhythmic songs which are in the form of a "feature call and response, speech–song", including the short history of the island of Bellona. The Melanesia Arts and Crafts Festival was held for the first time in Honaria in 1998 when five Melanesian Countries participated.

The present trend in dancing among the youth of the Islands and in Honiara also is freestyle dancing, which has become part of the night life and entertainment scene. These dance bears no resemblance to the traditional dance forms of the Solomon Islands, and are copied from the films You Got Served, the Step Up franchise and Stomp the Yard. Panpipe performances are held at the Mendana Hotel in Honiara every week. The Panpipe band is the Narasirato from Are'are in south Maleta. The Mao dancers from Kawara'ae, the Wasi Ka Nanara Pan Pipers, Tamure dancing, and Batikama Adventist bamboo band are other groups. Gilbertese dancing is also popular along with Panpipe music groups. Most of these dances are performed in the leading hotels of Honiara.

Religion
Honiara is predominantly Christian and is served by the headquarters of the Church of the Province of Melanesia (Anglican), the Roman Catholic Archdiocese of Honiara, the South Seas Evangelical Church, the United Church, the Seventh-day Adventist Church and other Christian churches. There are many congregations of American and Australian style charismatic and evangelical movements. There are also members of the Baháʼí Faith, Buddhists, Jehovah's Witnesses, Mormons, and Muslims such as the Ahmadiyya Muslim Community.

The Anglican Church of Melanesia, a province of the Anglican Communion, was established in 1849 by George Augustus Selwyn of New Zealand. Initially, it was the Church of the Province of New Zealand, but in 1975 it became part of an ecclesiastical Province covering Solomon Islands, the Republic of Vanuatu and the French Territory of New Caledonia in the South Western Pacific. The Church of Melanesia in Honiara operates three missions, the Melanesian Board of Mission, the Melanesian Brotherhood and the Mission to Seafarers Society from Honiara. The Melanesian Board of Mission oversees the Home Mission and the mission in other regional countries. The Most Reverend. David Vunagi has been archbishop of Melanesia since May 2009, when he formally took over the post at the Cathedral Church of St Barnabas, Honiara.

The Melanesian Brotherhood, established by Ini Kopuria on 28 October 1925, has offices in Honiara. It operates in East Asia, Australia and the Pacific, and Europe, and  has 96 Brothers in active mission work. It is a Religious Community of the Anglican Communion, similar to other religious communities, committed to "vows of celibacy, obedience and poverty", by training young men into religious pursuits and evangelism. The Mission to Seafarers Society, also with its offices in Honiara, with its network of chaplain, honorary chaplain, staff, and helpers, communicates with seafarers in the Port of Honiara and many ports of the world with the objective of spiritual and practical welfare of seafarers belonging to many races and creeds, and their families.

Sports

Honiara has three main stadiums, the largest of which is Lawson Tama Stadium, the national stadium of Solomon Islands. The stadium, funded by FIFA, is built into the hillside and can hold 10,000 people. The stadium hosted the 2012 OFC Nations Cup. The most recent and most prolific winners of the Telekom S-League, Koloale FC and Solomon Warriors FC, respectively, are both based out of the city.

Yachting is popular in Honiara and it contains the Point Cruz Yacht Club on the harbour. Honiara Golf Club lies on the eastern side of the town, not far from the Lunga River, near the King George VI High School (between Honiara and the airport) was initially nine-hole course on a flat land which was earlier an airstrip. An 18 tee 11-hole golf course was built in the late 1960s. Boxing, rugby, athletics, basketball, netball, and volleyball are also practised. Netball leagues are organised in Honiara for girls and is well-organized in surrounding larger villages, usually by women's clubs.

Transport
The city lies on the Kukum Highway and is served by Honiara International Airport. Henderson Field, operated during the Solomon Islands campaign, was reopened in 1969 as the nation's largest airport. The airport has been improved to receive large aircraft. Solomon Airlines, the state owned airline, is based at Honiara.

The seaport of Point Cruz is the main port of entry into Solomon Islands. International shipping companies operate as the port has the facility to handle  containers. Passenger boats services operate from Honiara's main wharf at Point Cruz and many shipping companies provide these services. Operators include the MV Pelican Express and MV Solomon Express, offering services once a week to Malaita and the western provincial cities of Mbunikalo, Seghe, Noro, and Gizo. The 26-hour boat trip to Gizo is said to be one of the most scenic of the Pacific.

Twin towns – sister cities
-Luganville, Vanuatu.
-Mackay, Queensland, Australia.
-Jiangmen, China
-Majuro, Marshall Islands

See also
 Chamburu

References

Bibliography

External links
 Video of Honiara in 1975
 Video of Honiara in 1974
 Video of Sir Donald Luddington swearing in Solomon Mamaloni in the 1970s (starts at 7.08 mins in)

 
Capitals in Oceania
+
Port cities in Oceania
Populated places in Guadalcanal Province
Populated places established in the 1940s
Subdivisions of the Solomon Islands
1940s establishments in Oceania